Joe Ward (born 25 November 1954 in Glasgow) is a Scottish former footballer, who played as a forward.

Career
Ward started his career with Clyde before winning a move to English side Aston Villa in the late 1970s. Ward played three games for the Villans, returning to Scotland with Hibernian where he played a further nine times before joining Dundee United. Ward's time at Tannadice was equally short as he played only six times before moving to Ayr United. After nearly forty appearances with the Honest Men, Ward moved on to Stirling Albion, before playing out his career with St Johnstone.

References

External links 

1954 births
Footballers from Glasgow
Living people
Scottish Football League players
Scottish footballers
English Football League players
Clyde F.C. players
Aston Villa F.C. players
Hibernian F.C. players
Dundee United F.C. players
Ayr United F.C. players
Stirling Albion F.C. players
St Johnstone F.C. players
Association football forwards